Abeed Mahmud Tajdin Janmohamed (born 10 December 1978, in Mombasa) is a Kenyan cricketer. He has represented his country at Under 19 level and currently plays for them in first class cricket. He usually takes on the role of wicketkeeper and is a right-handed batsman. 

Janmohamed has also played some first-class cricket for Oxford Universities.

External links

1978 births
Living people
Kenyan cricketers
Sportspeople from Mombasa
Oxford Universities cricketers
Wicket-keepers